James Hector McRae Dunn (22 April 1886 – 8 November 1975) was an Australian politician.

He was born in Cathkin to farmer James Dunn and Honona McRae. He attended state school and Scotch College, Melbourne, becoming the paymaster of a coal mine at Wonthaggi, where he was a founding member of the local Coal Miners' Union. In 1906 he married Mary Buchanan, with whom he had five children. He later worked for the railways, and was stores administrator for the Federal Capital Commission's construction branch from 1915. There he organised the first Labor Party branch in the Australian Capital Territory. From 1932 he ran a wine saloon in Geelong, and was private secretary to John Dedman, a federal minister.

In 1950, he was elected to the Victorian Legislative Assembly as the Labor member for Geelong. He lost preselection in 1955 and stood unsuccessfully as an Independent Labor candidate for Geelong West. He rejoined the Labor Party later in life. Dunn retired to Cathkin and died at Alexandra in 1975.

References

1886 births
1975 deaths
Australian Labor Party members of the Parliament of Victoria
Independent members of the Parliament of Victoria
Members of the Victorian Legislative Assembly
20th-century Australian politicians
People educated at Scotch College, Melbourne